Jones County is in the southeastern portion of the U.S. state of Mississippi. As of the 2020 census, the population was 67,246. Its county seats are Laurel and Ellisville.

Jones County is part of the Laurel micropolitan area.

History
They named it Jones County after John Paul Jones, the early American Naval hero who rose from humble Scottish origin to military success during the American Revolution.

Ellisville, the county seat, was named for Powhatan Ellis, a member of the Mississippi Legislature who claimed to be a direct descendant of Pocahontas. During the economic hard times in the 1830s and 1840s, there was an exodus of population from Southeast Mississippi, both to western Mississippi and Louisiana in regions opened to white settlement after Indian Removal, and to Texas. The slogan "GTT" ("Gone to Texas") became widely used.

Jones County was in an area of mostly yeomen farmers and lumbermen, as the pine forests, swamp and soil were not easily cultivated for cotton. In 1860, the majority of white residents were not slaveholders. Slaves made up only 12% of the total population in Jones County in 1860, the smallest percentage of any county in the state.

Civil War years
Soon after the election of Abraham Lincoln as United States president in November 1860, slave-owning planters led Mississippi to join South Carolina and secede from the Union. These were the two states with the largest holdings of slaves. On November 29, 1860, the Mississippi state legislature called for a "Convention of the people of Mississippi" to be held to "adopt such measures for vindicating the sovereignty of the State as shall appear to them to be demanded." The Convention convened on January 7, 1861, and the elected representatives from the various counties of Mississippi voted 83–15 to secede from the Union. Notably, included in the vote to secede was the representative from Jones County, Mr. John H. Powell. Other Southern states would follow suit.

As Mississippi debated the secession question, the inhabitants of Jones County voted overwhelmingly for the anti-secessionist John Hathorne Powell, Jr. In comparison to the pro-secessionist J.M. Bayliss, who received 24 votes, Powell received 374. But, at the Secession Convention, Powell voted for secession. Legend has it that, for his vote, he was burned in effigy in Ellisville, the county seat.

The reality is more complicated. The only choices possible at the Secession Convention were voting for immediate secession on the one hand, or for a more cautious, co-operative approach to secession among several Southern states on the other. Powell almost certainly voted for the more conservative approach to secession—the only position available to him that was consistent with the anti-secessionist views of his constituency.

Mississippi's Declaration of Secession reflected planters' interests in its first sentence: "Our position is thoroughly identified with the institution of slavery…" Jones County had mostly yeoman farmers and cattle herders, who were not slaveholders and had little use for a war over slavery.

During the American Civil War, Jones County and neighboring counties, especially Covington County to its west, became a haven for Confederate deserters. A number of factors prompted desertions. The lack of food and supplies was demoralizing, while reports of poor conditions back home made the men fear for their families' survival. Small farms deteriorated from neglect as women and children struggled to keep them up. Their limited stores and livestock were often taken by the Confederate tax-in-kind agents, who took excessive amounts of yeoman farmers' goods. Many residents and soldiers were also outraged over the Confederate government's passing of the Twenty Negro Law, allowing wealthy plantation owners to avoid military service if they owned twenty slaves or more. In spite of the great displeasure the law caused, few men actually were affected by the law. For example, out of the roughly 38,000 Slaveowners living in the South in 1860, 200 in Virginia, 120 in North Carolina, 201 in Georgia, and 300 in South Carolina won exemptions.

Free State of Jones 

On October 13, 1863, a band of deserters from Jones County and adjacent counties organized to protect the area from Confederate authorities and the crippling tax collections. The company, led by Newton Knight, formed a separate government, with Unionist leanings, known as the "Free State of Jones", and fought a recorded 14 skirmishes with Confederate forces. They also raided Paulding, capturing five wagonloads of corn that had been collected for tax from area farms, which they distributed back among the local population. The company harassed Confederate officials. Deaths believed to be at their hands were reported in 1864 among numerous tax collectors, conscript officers, and other officials.

The governor was informed by the Jones County court clerk that deserters had made tax collections in the county impossible. By the spring of 1864, the Knight company had taken effective control from the Confederate government in the county. The followers of Knight raised an American flag over the courthouse in Ellisville, and sent a letter to Union General William T. Sherman declaring Jones County's independence from the Confederacy. In July 1864, the Natchez Courier reported that Jones County had seceded from the Confederacy.

Scholars have disputed whether the county truly seceded, with some concluding it did not fully secede. While there have been numerous attempts to study Knight and his followers, the lack of documentation during and after the war has made him an elusive figure. The rebellion in Jones County has been variously characterized as consisting of local skirmishes to being a full-fledged war of independence. It assumed legendary status among some county residents and Civil War historians, culminating in the release of a 2016 feature film, Free State of Jones. The film is credited as "based on the books 'The Free State of Jones' by Victoria E. Bynum and 'The State of Jones' by Sally Jenkins and John Stauffer."

The county changed its name to Davis County, after Confederate president Jefferson Davis, on November 30, 1865, and kept the name until four years later.

Geography

Adjacent counties
 Jasper County (north)
 Wayne County (east)
 Perry County (southeast)
 Forrest County (southwest)
 Covington County (west)
 Smith County (northwest)

National protected area
 De Soto National Forest (part)

Demographics

2020 census

As of the 2020 United States census, there were 67,246 people, 24,178 households, and 16,729 families residing in the county.

2000 census
At the 2000 census there were 64,958 people, 24,275 households, and 17,550 families in the county.  The population density was 94 people per square mile (36/km2).  There were 26,921 housing units at an average density of 39 per square mile (15/km2).  The racial makeup of the county was 71.11% White, 26.34% Black or African American, 0.39% Native American, 0.27% Asian, 0.01% Pacific Islander, 1.41% from other races, and 0.48% from two or more races.  1.96% of the population were Hispanic or Latino of any race.
Of the 24,275 households 32.60% had children under the age of 18 living with them, 53.00% were married couples living together, 15.10% had a female householder with no husband present, and 27.70% were non-families. 24.40% of households were one person and 11.00% were one person aged 65 or older.  The average household size was 2.61 and the average family size was 3.08.

The age distribution was 25.80% under the age of 18, 10.50% from 18 to 24, 27.30% from 25 to 44, 22.20% from 45 to 64, and 14.20% 65 or older.  The median age was 36 years. For every 100 females, there were 93.70 males.  For every 100 females age 18 and over, there were 90.10 males.

The median household income was $28,786 and the median family income  was $34,465. Males had a median income of $28,273 versus $19,405 for females. The per capita income for the county was $14,820.  About 14.30% of families and 19.80% of the population were below the poverty line, including 25.00% of those under age 18 and 16.80% of those age 65 or over.

Economy
The economy of Jones County is still primarily rural and based on resources – timber and agriculture.

According to the Economic Development Authority of Jones County, the top employers in the county are:

Government and infrastructure
The Mississippi Department of Mental Health South Mississippi State Hospital Crisis Intervention Center is in Laurel and in Jones County.

Transportation

Major highways
  Interstate 59
  U.S. Highway 11
  U.S. Highway 84
  Mississippi Highway 15
  Mississippi Highway 28
  Mississippi Highway 29

Airport
Hattiesburg-Laurel Regional Airport is located in an unincorporated area in the county, near Moselle.

Politics

Communities

Cities
 Ellisville
 Laurel

Towns
 Sandersville
 Soso

Census-designated place
 Eastabuchie
 Moselle
 Ovett
 Sharon

Unincorporated communities
 Amy
 Errata
 Sand Hill
 Tawanta
 Whitfield

Notable people

 Lance Bass, singer with NSYNC
 Ralph Boston, Olympic track and field medalist
 Jason Campbell, retired National Football League quarterback
 Mary Elizabeth Ellis-Day, actress
 Carroll Gartin, lieutenant governor of Mississippi
 Newton Knight, farmer and opponent of secession and slavery, a Confederate deserter who led a guerrilla rebellion against local Confederate officials as the leader of the Knight Company and Jones County Scouts; he was a US Marshal and a leading Republican figure in the Reconstruction of Mississippi
 Jill Collen Jefferson, human rights lawyer
 Tom Lester, actor played Eb on Green Acres
 Amos McLemore, schoolteacher, Methodist pastor, businessman, and one-time opponent of Southern secession from the Union; commissioned as a Confederate officer at the rank of major; he was reputedly assassinated by Newton Knight
 Charles W. Pickering, retired Federal Circuit Judge who served on the United States Court of Appeals for the Fifth Circuit
 Parker Posey, actress
 Leontyne Price, operatic soprano
 James Street, author
 Ray Walston, actor My Favorite Martian

See also

Bainbridge County
 National Register of Historic Places listings in Jones County, Mississippi

References

Further reading
 Ballard, Michael B. and Mark R. Cheathem, Of Times and Race: Essays Inspired by John F. Marszalek, Oxford, MS: University Press of Mississippi, 2013
 Bynum, Victoria E. (2002). The Free State of Jones: Mississippi's Longest Civil War. The University of North Carolina Press.
 Downing, David C. (2007). A South Divided: Portraits of Dissent in the Confederacy. Nashville: Cumberland House. .
 Galloway, G. Norton., Historian Sixth Army Corps. (November 1886). "A Confederacy within a Confederacy," Magazine of American History 16. 
 Jenkins, Sally, and John Stauffer (2009). The State of Jones: The Small Southern County that Seceded from the Confederacy, New York: Random House. .
 Leverett, Rudy H. (1984, second printing 2009). Legend of the Free State of Jones. University Press of Mississippi.  , .
 McLemore, Richard Aubrey. (1973) History of Mississippi (2 volumes), University & College Press of Mississippi.

External links
 Jones County Courthouse Pictures
 Jones County Sheriff's Office

 
Mississippi counties
Separatism in the United States
Southern Unionists in the American Civil War
1826 establishments in Mississippi
Populated places established in 1826
Laurel micropolitan area